William Herbert Wrigglesworth (12 November 1912 – 11 August 1980) was an English footballer who played as a forward. He played for Chesterfield, before joining First Division Wolverhampton Wanderers in 1934. He was top scorer for Wolves in the 1935–36 season with 13 goals. Wrigglesworth joined Manchester United in 1937. He spent 10 years with Manchester United but for most of that time there was no competitive senior football due to the Second World War, meaning that he was restricted to 37 matches for the club, scoring 10 goals. In 1947, he was transferred to Bolton Wanderers in a swap deal that involved goalkeeper Bill Fielding going to Old Trafford.

Personal life 
Wrigglesworth's younger brother Bob was also a footballer and was killed during the Second World War.

Honours 
Chesterfield

 Derbyshire Senior Cup: 1932–33
 Chesterfield Hospital Senior Cup: 1933–34

Career statistics

References

External links
Profile at StretfordEnd.co.uk
Profile at MUFCInfo.com

1912 births
People from South Elmsall
1980 deaths
English footballers
Association football forwards
Frickley Athletic F.C. players
Chesterfield F.C. players
Wolverhampton Wanderers F.C. players
Manchester United F.C. players
Bolton Wanderers F.C. players
Southampton F.C. players
Reading F.C. players
Burton Albion F.C. players
Scarborough F.C. players
Brentford F.C. wartime guest players
Cardiff City F.C. wartime guest players
York City F.C. wartime guest players
Walsall F.C. wartime guest players
Chelsea F.C. wartime guest players
Arsenal F.C. wartime guest players
Sportspeople from Yorkshire